Endomychus limbatus is a species of handsome fungus beetle in the family Endomychidae, and is found in North America.

References

Further reading

 

Endomychidae
Articles created by Qbugbot
Beetles described in 1870